Noatak Airport  is a state-owned public-use airport located one nautical mile (1.85 km) southwest of the central business district of Noatak, in the Northwest Arctic Borough of the U.S. state in Alaska.

Facilities 
Noatak Airport has one runway designated 1/19 with a gravel surface measuring 4,000 by 60 feet (1,219 x 18 m).

Airlines and destinations 

Prior to its bankruptcy and cessation of all operations, Ravn Alaska served the airport from multiple locations.

References

External links
 FAA Alaska airport diagram (GIF)
 

Airports in Northwest Arctic Borough, Alaska
Airports in the Arctic